The Asian Men's Volleyball Championship is an international volleyball competition in Asia and Oceania contested by the senior men's national teams of the members of Asian Volleyball Confederation (AVC), the sport's continent governing body. The initial gap between championships was four years, but since 1987 they have been awarded every two years. The current champion is Iran, which won its fourth title at the 2021 tournament.

History
The first tournament was held in 1975 with the participation of seven national teams. Japan captured the first gold. The next edition was held in 1979, were won by China and Wang Jiawei hailed as the first ever MVP of the tournament. However, in 1980s Japan managed to return at first position. They captured another Asian gold in 1983 and repeated this success at next edition in 1897. In 1989, twice runners-up South Korea won its maiden Asian title at the home tournament. The three teams from East Asia dominated the tournament for next three decades.

The domination of East Asian teams was ceased in 2007 when Australia unprecedentally won their first ever title. The next tournament was won again by Japan. In 2011, Iran took their first ever title at the home tournament and repeated this success at the next edition in 2013.

The 2015 Asian Championship took place again in Tehran, Iran. It was won by Japan who managed to beat home favorites – Iran – in 3–1 victory. They also won the next tournament.

The 2019 Asian Championship was hosted by Iran for the third time and they won and captured their 3rd title after defeating Australia in 3–0 victory. For the first time in the tournament, the 2021 edition was held in two venues in Japan. In the final match held in Chiba, Iran finally took their revenge against home favorites – Japan – in 3–1 victory and won their fourth Asian title.

The 21 Asian Championship tournaments have been won by five different national teams. Japan have won nine times. The other Asian Championship winners are South Korea and Iran, with four titles each; China, with three titles; and Australia, with one title.

Australia, China, Japan, and South Korea co-holds record for the participation at the Asian Championships (21 times).

Results summary

Teams reaching the top four

Champions by region

Hosts
List of hosts by number of championships hosted.

Medal summary

Participating nations
Legend
 – Champions
 – Runners-up
 – Third place
 – Fourth place
 – Did not enter / Did not qualify
 – Hosts
Q – Qualified for the forthcoming tournament

Debut of teams

MVP by edition
1975 – Not awarded
1979 – 
1983–97 – Not awarded
1999 – 
2001 – 
2003 – 
2005 – 
2007 – 
2009 – 
2011 – 
2013 – 
2015 – 
2017 – 
2019 – 
2021 – 
2023 –

See also
 Asian Women's Volleyball Championship
 Volleyball at the Asian Games
 Asian Men's Volleyball Cup
 Asian Men's Volleyball Challenge Cup
 Asian Men's U23 Volleyball Championship
 Asian Men's U20 Volleyball Championship
 Asian Boys' U18 Volleyball Championship

References

 Sports123.com

External links
 Asian Volleyball Confederation – official website

 

V
Volleyball
International volleyball competitions
International men's volleyball competitions
Volleyball competitions in Asia
Biennial sporting events
Asian Volleyball Confederation competitions